Chowringhee is a neighbourhood in central Kolkata, West Bengal, India.

Chowringhee may also refer to:
Chowringhee (novel), a 1962 Bengali novel by Sankar
Chowringhee (film), a 1968 film based on the novel